Troy Duffy is an American filmmaker and musician. He has directed two films, The Boondock Saints and its sequel The Boondock Saints II: All Saints Day. Duffy was the subject of the 2003 documentary film Overnight.

Film career 
Duffy moved to Los Angeles in his twenties to pursue a music career with his band, The Brood. While seeking gigs, he worked at a bar where he wrote the script for the film The Boondock Saints during his break periods. The inspiration for the screenplay happened one day when he came home from his job to find a dead woman being wheeled out of a drug dealer's apartment across the hall. Duffy then rented a computer and wrote the screenplay for The Boondock Saints based on his disgust at what he saw:

 The script featured two brothers in Boston dedicated to killing Mafia thugs.

Duffy had completed the screenplay in fall of 1996 and passed it to a producer's assistant at New Line Cinema to be read by a senior executive. The screenplay changed hands through multiple studios and Duffy was approached by multiple producers for the rights. In March 1997, he was contracted by Paramount Pictures for $500,000, and later in the month, Miramax Films won a bidding war to buy The Boondock Saints. The studio offered $450,000 to Duffy to write and direct the film. It was reported the script was worth $300,000, and the film itself was originally given a $15 million budget by Miramax's Harvey Weinstein. Duffy's band The Brood would do the soundtrack, and as a bonus, Miramax offered to buy and throw in co-ownership of J. Sloan's, the bar where Duffy worked.

Filming of The Boondock Saints was scheduled for the coming autumn in Boston. Duffy sought to cast Stephen Dorff and Mark Wahlberg as the Irish brothers, though Wahlberg passed for Boogie Nights. The director also wanted to cast Billy Connolly and Kenneth Branagh in the film, with Branagh playing the gay FBI agent. Duffy also expressed interest in casting Brendan Fraser, Nicky Katt, and Ewan McGregor, with two of them as the brothers, but no decisions were finalized. The director later sought Patrick Swayze to play the FBI agent, but Miramax preferred Sylvester Stallone (with whom the studio had an existing relationship), Bill Murray or Mike Myers. Before pre-production work was supposed to begin in Boston in December 1997, Miramax pulled out of the project. Producer Lloyd Segan said that the project had stalled due to casting and location problems. While Duffy was able to keep the writer's fee of $300,000, the studio required the reimbursement of the $150,000 director's fee and the $700,000 advance to develop the project.

After being dropped by Miramax, still believing that the film was a hot commodity, Duffy convinced agents at the William Morris Agency to help him market it to other studios. The independent studio Franchise Pictures agreed to finance the project, for less than half of Miramax's original budget, once other elements were in place. Desperate to get the project rolling and convinced that it would eventually prove a major success, Duffy took the deal. Duffy approached actors Sean Patrick Flanery and Norman Reedus to play the Irish vigilante brothers and Willem Dafoe to play the FBI agent. Having found someone to back the film, filming began in Toronto, with the final scenes being filmed in Boston. The name of Duffy's band The Brood was changed to The Boondock Saints, following the movie's release. The film featured two songs from the band: "Holy Fool", which played during Rocco's tavern shootout, and "Pipes", which played during the credits.

After shooting, the film was shopped at the 1999 Cannes Film Festival in the hopes of finding a distributor, but every major American studio turned it down. After failing to find a distributor at Cannes, the film was eventually picked up by a small company for a limited theatrical release of five theaters in the U.S. for a period of seven days.

Duffy's rise to fame was chronicled in two documentaries: Off the Boulevard (2011), by Jeff Santo, and Overnight (2003), by Tony Montana and Mark Brian Smith.

Through word of mouth, The Boondock Saints has grossed over $50 million in domestic video sales, of which Duffy received nothing due to the structure of the contract he signed with the distribution company.  According to Duffy, neither he, his producers nor his principal cast got paid.  He sued Franchise Pictures and other undisclosed companies for royalties of the first film and rights to the sequel.  After a lengthy lawsuit, Troy Duffy, his producers and the principal cast received an undisclosed amount of The Boondock Saints royalties as well as the sequel rights.

After a number of years, Duffy directed the sequel to The Boondock Saints, titled The Boondock Saints II: All Saints Day which was released on October 30, 2009.  The film grossed $11 million at the box office (the film was released limited, never playing on more than 524 screens) and has grossed over $50 million in DVD sales (as of June 2012). The film had an $8 million budget.

Duffy co-wrote the 2020 comedy film Guest House, which was directed by Sam Macaroni and stars Pauly Shore.

Music career 
The attention paid to The Boondock Saints and the fact that Duffy's band would be producing its soundtrack created a small but significant interest in Duffy's band "The Brood", which had previously been ignored. The band consisted of Duffy, his brother Taylor, and two friends, Gordon "Gordo" Clark, and Jimi Jackson. The members frequented several North Hollywood taverns and were featured in the bar scene of The Boondock Saints.

After being courted by Maverick Records, the band eventually signed a deal in 1999 with a subsidiary of Atlantic Records, which produced their first and only album, Release the Hounds, (Duffy having changed the band's name from The Brood to The Boondock Saints) which only sold 690 copies in total. Jeff Baxter was the recording producer.

Filmography

As writer/director
 The Boondock Saints (1999)
 The Boondock Saints II: All Saints Day (2009)

As writer
 Guest House (2020)

As actor
 Overnight (2003) as himself

Discography
 Release the Hounds (1999) (Atlantic Records)

References

External links 

American male screenwriters
Living people
Writers from Hartford, Connecticut
American bandleaders
Musicians from Hartford, Connecticut
Screenwriters from Connecticut
Film producers from Connecticut
20th-century American male writers
21st-century American male writers
Film directors from Connecticut
Year of birth missing (living people)